Vinod Kumar Mehta was an Indian police officer who served with Kolkata Police. He was an Indian Police Service officer and served as Deputy Commissioner of Police at the time of his murder in 1984. He with his body guard Mukhtar Ali were murdered on  18 March 1984 in Garden Reach. The prime suspect Idris Ali died in police custody.

References

Indian police officers killed in the line of duty
1984 deaths
People murdered in West Bengal
Indian Police Service officers
Police officers from Kolkata
1984 murders in India